T. leonina may refer to:
 Thyrocopa leonina, a moth species in the genus Thyrocopa endemic to Hawaii
 Toxascaris leonina, a common parasitic roundworm species found in dogs, cats, foxes and related host species

See also
 Leonina (disambiguation)